Tom Kåre Nikolaisen (born 29 December 1997) is a Norwegian handball player for Bergischer HC and the Norwegian national team.

He represented Norway at the 2020 European Men's Handball Championship.

References

External links

1997 births
Living people
Norwegian male handball players
Sportspeople from Trondheim
Bergischer HC players